Manganese arsenide (MnAs) is an intermetallic compound, an arsenide of manganese. MnAs has potential applications in spintronics, for electrical spin injection into GaAs and Si based devices.

References

Manganese compounds
Arsenides